The 2023 UEC European Track Championships were the thirteenth edition of the elite UEC European Track Championships in track cycling and took place at the Tissot Velodrome in Grenchen, Switzerland, from 8 to 12 February 2023.

Schedule

A = Afternoon session, E = Evening sessionQ = qualifiers, R1 = first round, R2 = second round, R = repechages, 1/16 = sixteenth finals, 1/8 = eighth finals, QF = quarterfinals, SF = semifinals,SR = Scratch Race, TR = Tempo Race, ER = Elimination Race, PR = Points Race

Events

 Competitors named in italics only participated in rounds prior to the final.
 These events are not contested in the Olympics.
 In the Olympics, these events are contested within the omnium only.

Medal table

References

External links
 Official website
 Results
 Results book

 
UEC European Track Championships
European Track Championships
2023 UEC
2023 UEC
February 2023 sports events in Switzerland
2023 in European sport
Grenchen